Reed Street Historic District is a national historic district located at Coxsackie in Greene County, New York. The district contains 30 contributing buildings. They are a collection of mid-19th century, two and three story commercial buildings.  The district displays a uniformity of style in its Italianate style brick facades with ornate brackets and overhanging eaves.  It also includes three late Federal style residences.

It was listed on the National Register of Historic Places in 1980.

References

Historic districts on the National Register of Historic Places in New York (state)
Federal architecture in New York (state)
Italianate architecture in New York (state)
Historic districts in Greene County, New York
National Register of Historic Places in Greene County, New York